The Equestrian statue of George I, by John van Nost the Elder, is a statue that stands outside the Barber Institute of Fine Arts in Birmingham, England.

The bronze statue was commissioned by the city of Dublin in 1717, as a gesture of loyalty towards George I (who had been King of Great Britain and Ireland since August 1714), in the face of support from Irish Catholics for the pretender to his throne, James Stuart.

George is shown wearing contemporary clothing, but with a laurel wreath in the Roman style. The work may have been finished by van Nost's students.

It was displayed on Essex Bridge (now Grattan Bridge) in Dublin from 1722 until some time between 1753 and 1755, when it was removed by George Semple, who was in charge of rebuilding the bridge, in order to prevent erosion caused by the flow of water around the pedestal on which the statue sat.

The statue was re-erected in 1798 in the gardens of the city's Mansion House. It was acquired for the Barber Institute, Birmingham in 1937 (at which time Dublin was the capital of the Irish Free State) by the institute's founding director, Thomas Bodkin, who had arrived there directly from his post as director of the National Gallery of Ireland in 1935.

In July 1982, the statue was granted legal protection as a Grade II listed structure, preventing unauthorised removal or alteration.

References 

1717 in art
Sculptures in Birmingham, West Midlands
Equestrian statues in the United Kingdom
George I of Great Britain
Grade II listed buildings in Birmingham
History of Birmingham, West Midlands
History of Dublin (city)
Public art in England
George 1, Birmingham
Statues of monarchs
Outdoor sculptures in the United Kingdom